Drip Capital is a digital trade finance company based in Palo Alto, California. The company offers working capital to small and medium sized companies engaged in cross-border trade in India, Mexico and the United States using technology and data analytics.

History
The company was founded in November 2014 by Wharton School alums Pushkar Mukewar and Neil Kothari. Using their prior experience in finance and technology, they set up the company to bridge the trade finance gap for SME export-import worldwide.

In 2016, Drip Capital  launched its Indian subsidiary, Drip Capital Services India LLP to begin operations in the country. In 2018, Drip introduced its supplier financing solutions and domestic factoring services for small businesses in Mexico. In early 2020, the company launched its buyer financing solutions for US-based SMB importers.

Products and services
Drip Capital currently offers collateral-free finance to businesses participating in international trade. The company uses electronic data and its proprietary automated risk management system to assess its customers and their deals. Drip offers credit lines ranging from $100,000 to $2.5 million, depending on the size of the business and its requirement.

Drip Capital has been extensively engaging with various trade associations and export promotion councils like FIEO, EEPC, CHEMEXCIL, and PLEXCONCIL to educate exporters about its product offerings. In November 2021, Drip Capital announced two new partnerships, a collaboration with CARGOES Finance by DP World and another with TradeLens, a blockchain enabled digital platform, to enable access to working capital for emerging market small and medium-sized businesses.

In September 2020, Drip Capital was named to the CB Insights Fintech 250 list. In March 2022, it was featured in Y Combinator's Top Companies list.

Growth and Funding
Since the start of operations, Drip has raised nearly $525 million through venture capital and debt. The company has raised over $95 million through investors such as Accel Partners, Sequoia Capital, TI Platform, Wing VC, Irongrey and Y Combinator and over $430 million from banks like the East West Bank and Barclays along with family offices, HNIs, institutional investors and wealth advisors. As of March 2022, it has funded more than $2.2 billion of international trade.

Locations 
Drip's corporate headquarters are Palo Alto, California. It also has offices in Mumbai, India and Mexico City, Mexico.

References

Companies based in California